The 1977–78 Superliga Espanola de Hockey Hielo season was the sixth season of the Superliga Espanola de Hockey Hielo, the top level of ice hockey in Spain. Seven teams participated in the league, and CH Casco Viejo Bilbao won the championship.

First round

Final round

External links
Season on hockeyarchives.info

Spain
Liga Nacional de Hockey Hielo seasons
Liga